Audrie J. Neenan is an American actress. She is best known on screen for her role as the raucous, abrasive madam Ray Parkins in the 1983 action film Sudden Impact and for playing judges in the TV series Law & Order and Law & Order: Special Victims Unit as Lois Preston. Many of her roles have been portrayals of intimidating female figures such as judges, policewomen and mouthy waitresses.

Neenan appeared as a waitress in Funny Farm (1988) serving Chevy Chase lamb fries and as a policewoman in See No Evil, Hear No Evil (1989) opposite Gene Wilder. In 2006, Neenan had a small role as a bar waitress in Martin Scorsese's The Departed. In 2008, she appeared in the John Patrick Shanley-directed sexual abuse drama Doubt, starring Meryl Streep and Philip Seymour Hoffman.

The red-haired Neenan has appeared in numerous TV shows such as Not Necessarily the News, Friends, Lois & Clark, Ally McBeal, the Cosby Show, and The Tonight Show Starring Johnny Carson. She is also a noted stage actress and made her Broadway debut opposite Faye Dunaway in William Alfred's Curse of an Aching Heart, and appeared at The Apollo and the Chicago Shakespeare Festival.

Selected filmography
Towing (1978) - Irate Lady
Somewhere in Time (1980) - Maid in Play (1912)
Sudden Impact (1983) - Ray Parkins
Love at Stake (1987) - Mrs. Babcock
Funny Farm (1988) - Ivy
See No Evil, Hear No Evil (1989) - Policewoman and Marilyn
Wedding Band (1989) - Judy
Slippery Slope (2006) - Floozy
The Departed (2006) - Woman at Bar #2
Ghost Town (2008) - Admitting Nurse
Doubt (2008) - Sister Raymond
BuzzKill (2012) - Waitress
Shelter (2014) - Shelter Worker 2
Crashing (2017) - Mrs Rita Holmes, Pete's mom
Puzzle (2018) - Aunt Emily

External links
 
Biography

Living people
American film actresses
American television actresses
American stage actresses
20th-century American actresses
21st-century American actresses
Place of birth missing (living people)
Year of birth missing (living people)